is a Japanese novelist.

Yokoyama specializes in mystery novels. 

He repeated his Kono Mystery ga Sugoi! No. 1 ranking in 2013 with Six Four (64).

The English edition of Six Four, translated by Jonathan Lloyd-Davies, was shortlisted for the 2016 CWA International Dagger.

He is known for his career as journalist for the Jomo Shimbun, the regional paper in Gunma.

Works in English translation

Novels
 Six Four (original title: 64 Rokuyon), trans. Jonathan Lloyd-Davies (riverrun, 2016)
Seventeen (original title: Kuraimāzu hai [Climber's High]), trans. Louise Heal Kawai (riverrun, 2018)
Prefecture D (original title: Kage no Kisetsu), trans. Jonathan Lloyd-Davies (riverrun, 2019)

Short story
 Motive (original title: Dōki), trans. Beth Cary (Ellery Queen's Mystery Magazine, May 2008)

Essay 
 My Favourite Mystery, "Paradise lost in the box" by Kenji Takemoto (Mystery Writers of Japan, Inc. )

Awards and nominations
Japanese Awards
 1998 – Matsumoto Seicho Prize: "Kage no Kisetsu" (Season of Shadows)
 2000 – Mystery Writers of Japan Award for Best Short Story: "Motive"
 2003 – The Best Japanese Crime Fiction of the Year (Kono Mystery ga Sugoi! 2003): Han'ochi (Half a Confession)
 2005 – Nominee for Honkaku Mystery Award for Best Fiction: Rinjō (Initial Response )
 2013 – The Best Japanese Crime Fiction of the Year (Kono Mystery ga Sugoi! 2013): Six Four

UK Award
 2016 – Shortlisted for the CWA International Dagger: Six Four

Bibliography

Novels
 , 1996
 , 1998
English translation: Prefecture D, riverrun, 2019
 , 2002
 , 2003
English translation: Seventeen, riverrun, 2018
 , 2005
 , 2005
 , 2012 
English translation: Six Four, riverrun, 2016
 , 2019

Short story collections
 , 2000
 , 2002
 , 2002
 , 2003
 , 2003
 , 2004
 , 2004
 , 2010

Film adaptations
Half a Confession (2004) (Han'ochi)
Deguchi no Nai Umi (2006)
Climber's High (2008) (Kuraimāzu hai)
Rinjō (2012)
Rokuyon (64) Part I (2016)
Rokuyon (64) Part II (2016)
Kagefumi (2019)

References

External links
 Doki (translated into Mandarin Chinese) – Google Books

Living people
Japanese writers
Japanese mystery writers
Mystery Writers of Japan Award winners
1957 births